Sir Louis-Napoléon Casault (July 10, 1823 – May 18, 1908) was a Quebec lawyer, judge, professor and political figure. He represented Bellechasse in the 1st Canadian Parliament from 1867 to 1870 as a Conservative member.

Biography
He was born in Saint-Pierre-de-la-Rivière-du-Sud in 1823. He studied at the Petit Séminaire de Québec, then apprenticed in law and was admitted to the bar in 1847. He practiced law at Quebec City. In 1854, he was elected to represent Montmagny in the Legislative Assembly of the Province of Canada. From 1858 to 1891, Casault taught commercial and maritime law at the Université Laval. In 1867, he was named Queen's Counsel. He was elected to the House of Commons in 1867 but resigned his seat in 1870 to accept a post as judge in the Superior Court of Quebec for Kamaraska district; in 1873, he was named to Quebec district. From 1894 until his retirement in 1904, he was Chief Justice for the Province of Quebec. He was knighted in 1894.

Casault died at Quebec City in 1908. A small lake in the unorganized territory of Lac-Casault, Quebec, Canada, was named after him.

Family
Hon Justice Louis-Napoléon Casault married Elmire Jane Pangman, daughter of Hon. John Pangman, M.L.C., and Seigneur of Lachenaye, July 1870. Their family residence was "Londesir" 9 de Salaberry Street, Quebec. Lady Casault was elected the first President of the Quebec branch of the National Council of Women of Canada, when that institution was founded by Ishbel Hamilton-Gordon, Marchioness of Aberdeen and Temair. She was also a member of various other bodies of a religious or benevolent character.

References

 

1823 births
1908 deaths
Members of the Legislative Assembly of the Province of Canada from Canada East
Conservative Party of Canada (1867–1942) MPs
Members of the House of Commons of Canada from Quebec
Judges in Quebec
Canadian Knights Bachelor
People from Chaudière-Appalaches
Université Laval alumni
Academic staff of Université Laval